N. Periasamy (died 26 May 2017) was an Indian politician and a former Member of the Legislative Assembly (MLA). He was elected to the Tamil Nadu legislative assembly as a Dravida Munnetra Kazhagam (DMK) candidate from Tuticorin constituency in the 1989 and 1996 elections.

Periasamy was Thoothukudi District DMK Secretary since 1985. He received the Kalaignar Award from his party in 2016.

Geetha Jeevan, a daughter of Periasamy, followed her father into politics, as did Jegan. Both were DMK members.

Periyasamy died on 26 May 2017, aged 78.

References

Further reading 

Year of birth missing
Dravida Munnetra Kazhagam politicians
Tamil Nadu MLAs 1996–2001
2017 deaths
Tamil Nadu MLAs 1989–1991